List of airports in Libya sorted by location.



Airports 

Airport names shown in bold indicate the airport has scheduled service on commercial airlines.

|- valign=top
| Bani Walid
| 
|
| Bani Walid Airport

|- valign=top
| Bayda 
| HLLQ
| LAQ
| Al Abraq International Airport

|- valign=top
| Benghazi 
| HLLB
| BEN
| Benina International Airport

|- valign=top
| Brak
|
| BCQ
| Brak Airport

|- valign=top
| Brega 
| HLMB
| LMQ
| Marsa Brega Airport
|- valign=top
| Derna
|
|
| Martuba Air Base
|- valign=top
| Ghadames
| HLTD
| LTD
| Ghadames Airport
|- valign=top
| Ghat
| HLGT
| GHT
| Ghat Airport 
|- valign=top
| rowspan="2" | Hun
| HLON
| HUQ
| Hun Airport

|- valign=top
| HLJF
|
| Al Jufra Air Base

|- valign=top
| Kufra
| HLKF
| AKF
| Kufra Airport 
|- valign=top

|- valign=top
| Misrata 
| HLMS
| MRA
| Misrata International Airport

|- valign=top
| Mizda
|
|
| Habit Awlad Muhammad Airport

|- valign=top
| Zuwara
| 
|
| Okba Ibn Nafa Air Base

|- valign=top
| Ra's Lanuf
| HLNF
|
| Ra's Lanuf Airport

|- valign=top
| Sabha
| HLLS
| SEB
| Sabha Airport

|- valign=top
| Sirte
| HLGD
| SRX
| Gardabya Airport

|- valign=top
| Tobruk
| HLGN
| TOB
| Tobruk Airport

|- valign=top
| rowspan="2" | Tripoli
| HLLM
| MJI
| Mitiga International Airport

|- valign=top
| HLLT
| TIP
| Tripoli International Airport

|- valign=top
| Ubari
| HLUB
| QUB
| Ubari Airport

|- valign=top
| Waddan
| HLWN
|
| Waddan Airport

|- valign=top
| Zintan
| HLZN
| ZIS
| Alzintan Airport

|- valign=top
| Zuwarah
| HLZW
| WAX
| Zuwarah Airport
|}

References 
 Libyan Civil Aviation Authority 
 
  - includes IATA codes
 Great Circle Mapper: Libya - IATA and ICAO codes
 World Aero Data: Libya - ICAO codes

Libya
 
Airports
Airports
Libya